Bad Salzhausen station is a railway station in the Bad Salzhausen district of Nidda, located in the Wetteraukreis district in Hesse, Germany.

References

Railway stations in Hesse
Buildings and structures in Wetteraukreis